Verf Kill flows into the Mohawk River near Pattersonville, New York.

Verf Kill is a name derived from Dutch meaning "paint creek".

References 

Rivers of Schenectady County, New York
Mohawk River
Rivers of New York (state)